Wild Style Original Soundtrack is the official soundtrack to the 1982 hip hop film Wild Style. It was originally released in 1983 via Animal Records, and re-released twice: in 1997 via Rhino Entertainment, and in 2007 as 25th anniversary edition via Mr Bongo Records. The album was produced by Charlie Ahearn and Chris Stein with Fab 5 Freddy, who served as musical director of the project. It featured appearances from Busy Bee, Cold Crush Brothers, DJ Charlie Chase, Grandmaster Caz, Grand Mixer DXT, Grand Wizzard Theodore & the Fantastic Five, Double Trouble (Rodney Cee & Kevie Kev Rockwell of Funky 4 + 1), Prince Whipper Whip, Rammellzee, AJ Scratch, D.J. Stieve Steve and Shockdell.

The album has been described by Leo Stanley from Allmusic as "one of the key records of early-'80s hip-hop". Thomas Golianopoulos and Mosi Reeves from Rolling Stone stated: "The soundtrack, which features beats produced by Chris Stein of Blondie and Fab 5 Freddy and live performances by Double Trouble and other old-school legends, is arguably the first great hip-hop album".

Track listing

Disc 2:
 Wildstyle Lesson - Kev Luckhurst aka Phat Kev
 Limousine Rap (Crime Don't Pay Mix) - Wild Style Allstars
 Basketball Throwdown (Dixie: Razorcut Mix) Cold Crush Brothers vs. Fantastic Freaks
 Stoop Rap (LP Version South Bronx Mix) - Double Trouble
 Street Rap (Subway Mix) - Busy Bee
 Stoop Rap (Film Version) Double Trouble
 B Boy Beat (Instrumental) - Wild Style Allstars
 Yawning Beat (Instrumental) - Wild Style Allstars
 Crime Cut (Instrumental) - Wild Style Allstars
 Gangbusters (Instrumental) - DJ Grand Wizard Theodore
 Cuckoo Clocking (Instrumental) - Fab 5 Freddy
 Meetings (Instrumental) - Wild Style Allstars
 Military Cut (Instrumental) - DJ Grand Wizard Theodore
 Razor Cut (Instrumental) - Wild Style Allstars
 Subway Theme (Instrumental) - DJ Grand Wizard Theodore, Chris Stein
 Busy Bees (Instrumental) - Busy Bee
 Down By Law (Instrumental) - Fab 5 Freddy
 Baby Beat (Instrumental) - Wild Style Allstars
 Jungle Beat (Instrumental) - Wild Style Allstars
 Wild Style Scratch Tool - Kev Luckhurst aka Phat Kev

NOTE: "Pretty Baby" and "Rapture" by Blondie and "Good Times" by Chic also feature in the film, but not on any edition of the soundtrack albums.

References

External links 
Wild Style related samples on WhoSampled
Wild Style Soundtrack (All Versions) on Discogs

Hip hop soundtracks
1983 soundtrack albums